Jay Johnston (born October 22, 1968) is an American actor and comedian. He is best known for his work as a writer and cast member on Mr. Show with Bob and David and for his roles on The Sarah Silverman Program, Arrested Development, and Bob's Burgers.

Early life and education
Johnston was born and raised in Chicago, Illinois. He earned a Bachelor of Arts degree in acting from Columbia College Chicago in 1993.

Career
After graduating from college, Johnston later joined the Chicago Second City's touring comedy for a number of years and also performed in stage shows at the Annoyance Theater in Chicago.

From 1995 to 1998, Johnston worked as a sketch actor and writer on all four seasons of Mr. Show with Bob and David. After the conclusion of Mr. Show, Johnston had a recurring role on Arrested Development, as well as appearing in films such as Anchorman: The Legend of Ron Burgundy and Bicentennial Man.

Johnston and fellow Mr. Show regulars Dino Stamatopoulos and Scott Adsit were part of the creative team behind Adult Swim's stop-motion animation series Moral Orel, which ran from 2005 to 2008. Johnston wrote and directed episodes of the series and voiced multiple characters in the first two seasons. 

Johnston starred on all three seasons of Comedy Central's The Sarah Silverman Program as "Officer Jay McPherson", the love interest of Sarah's sister Laura in the series. The series reunited Johnston with Mr. Show cast members Brian Posehn, Scott Aukerman, B. J. Porter, and Paul F. Tompkins.

Johnston had a recurring voice role as Jimmy Pesto Sr. in the Fox animated series Bob's Burgers from 2011 until his firing in 2021.

Controversies 
In 2015, Johnston appeared on The Gavin McInnes Show, a show hosted by the eponymous founder of the far-right extremist group, the Proud Boys.

In March 2021, a Twitter message by the FBI was seeking the identity of a man at the 2021 United States Capitol attack who bore a resemblance to Johnston and who was identified as Johnston by friends of the actor. In a December 21, 2021 article by The Daily Beast, two of Johnston's friends said he admitted to being at the Capitol on January 6. After the FBI tweet and the news of his alleged participation, Johnston's friends and colleagues from Mr. Show with Bob and David reached out to Johnston, but received no response. As of December 2021, Johnston was fired from Bob's Burgers. It is unclear if Johnston has been charged, arrested, or brought in for questioning.

Filmography

Film

Television

References

External links

1968 births
Living people
Male actors from Chicago
Comedians from Illinois
Television producers from Illinois
American sketch comedians
American male comedians
American male film actors
American male television actors
American television directors
American male television writers
American male voice actors
Columbia College Chicago alumni
Protesters in or near the January 6 United States Capitol attack
20th-century American male actors
21st-century American male actors
20th-century American comedians
21st-century American comedians